Pheidole californica is an ant, a species of higher myrmicine in the family Formicidae.

Subspecies
These two subspecies belong to the species Pheidole californica:
 Pheidole californica californica Mayr, 1870 i c g
 Pheidole californica oregonica Emery, 1895 i c g
Data sources: i = ITIS, c = Catalogue of Life, g = GBIF, b = Bugguide.net

References

Further reading

External links

 

californica
Articles created by Qbugbot
Insects described in 1870